Berria (Basque: News) is the only daily newspaper published wholly in the Basque language and which can be read in the entirety of the Basque country. It was created after the closure of the previous Basque language newspaper, Egunkaria, by the Spanish government, after being accused of having ties with ETA. The newspaper shutdown was regarded by many as an attack on freedom of speech and the Basque language. After 7 years, in April 2010, the editorial team were found not guilty and acquitted.     

Berria is published daily, with the exception of Monday. The first issue was released on 21 June 2003. The newspaper's headquarters is in Andoain, Gipuzkoa, in the autonomous Basque region, Euskadi, in northern Spain. It also has offices in Vitoria-Gasteiz, Pamplona, Bilbao and Bayonne.

References

External links

, with an English version

Daily newspapers published in Spain
Basque-language newspapers
Basque companies
2003 establishments in Spain
Gipuzkoa